The Old Dock, originally known as Thomas Steers' dock, was the world's first commercial wet dock.  
The  dock was built on the River Mersey in Liverpool, England, starting in 1710 and completed in 1716. A natural tidal pool off the River Mersey, which probably gave its name to Liverpool centuries earlier, was partially filled and locked in from the river with quay walls erected.

History
The Old Dock was built at a cost of £11,000 and opened on 31 August 1715.  Thomas Steers was the engineer responsible; and additional advice was obtained from George Sorocold. Originally a tidal basin was accessed directly from the river, and from 1737 access was via Canning Dock. The dock was built with one graving dock; a second and third graving dock were added in 1746 and the 1750s. The dock walls were constructed from brick laid directly on to sandstone bedrock. The dock gates would have allowed as much as 10% of the water out between high tides, resulting in a water level drop of several feet. This may have been offset by water entering the dock from a stream. It accommodated up to 100 ships.

Although Liverpool vessels were involved in the slave trade before the dock opened, it would have served ships involved in the Africa-America trade, propelling Liverpool to world leader of this trade. The dock led to Liverpool's establishment as the leading European port and subsequent world trading port.

Redevelopment

In the early 19th century, the dock was considered too small for the growing size of shipping using the port; the quays were too narrow; the city's sewage polluted the dock's water; and the narrow wooden drawbridge across its entrance channel caused traffic jams. Sentiment saved the Old Dock for 20 years, but the Old Dock closed on 31 August 1826 and was filled in. Liverpool’s fourth Custom House, designed by John Foster, was built on the site between 1828 and 1837, and was demolished after severe bomb damage during the Battle of Britain (World War II).

In 1999 an office block on the site, Steers House, was demolished, and the resulting waste ground was used as an NCP car park until 2004, when the site was incorporated into the Liverpool One shopping development. A water feature has been built on the site of Old Dock to commemorate its history. A portion of the dock wall is exposed in the basement of the new development, and can be viewed from the pavement above through a viewing window in the ground. The excavated site was opened to the public in May 2010. Tours of the Old Dock are currently operated by National Museums Liverpool on a weekly basis.

Media
The excavation of the dock featured in a Time Team Special episode, first broadcast on Channel 4 on Monday 21 April 2008.

Old Dock Sill
The level of the sill of its entrance is used in and around Liverpool as a height datum called Old Dock Sill or ODS.

References

Sources

Further reading

Jarvis, Adrian (2014). Liverpool a history of 'The Great Port', Liverpool History Press.

External links

 
 

Liverpool docks
Redeveloped ports and waterfronts in Merseyside
Docks (maritime)
Former buildings and structures in Liverpool